Ibrahim Hamid (born 13 July 1993), is a Ugandan animator, creative director and co-founder of Kugali, an African entertainment company that focuses on telling stories inspired by African Culture using comic books, art and Augmented reality. He has worked on several Hollywood film such as The Predator, Disney's Dumbo and The Lion King.

Personal life 
Ibrahim Hamid was born on 13 July 1993 in Kampala before relocating to Nairobi. Upon relocating to the United Kingdom, Hamid graduated in 2017 with a Bachelors Administration in 3D Animation and Visual Effects from the University of Hertfordshire.

Career 
After his graduation in 2017, Hamid joined visual effects studio Moving Picture Company, where he worked on feature films such as the live-action remake of the Lion King (2019).

Together with Ziki Nelson and Tolu Olowofoyeku, Hamid co-founded Kugali (an entertainment company that tells stories inspired by African culture, through art, comic books, and augmented reality) in 2017 before pursuing it full-time in 2018.

References

External links 
The African comic hoping to take on Disney
Hamid Ibrahim
How a comment earned Ugandan Animator a big deal with Disney
300 SECONDS with Hamid Ibrahim
Video: Hamid Ibrahim, Olufikayo Ziki Adeola and Tolu Olowofoyeku on 'Iwaju' Reveal at D23 Expo - Hollywood Insider
Hamid Ibrahim: Telling African Stories Through Kugali Media by BlkWmnAnimator
Hamid Ibrahim – Kugali
Hamid Ibrahim

1993 births
Living people
People from Kampala
Visual effects artists